Grigory Mikhailovich Naginskiy (born June 16, 1958 in Orsk, Orenburg Oblast) is a Russian politician, Candidate of Sciences. Senator – member of the Federation Council from Leningrad Oblast in 2003–2010, member of Industrial Policy Committee and Commission in natural monopolies.

Biography 

Naginskiy graduated from Ural Polytechnic University in 1980, with a specialization in Heat and Power Engineering. Additionally, he was a candidate in Economic Sciences. He began his career in 1980 as an engineer in the Installation and Construction Directorate – 90 and continued his career up to the level of Deputy Chief Engineer. Following the accident at the Chernobyl nuclear power plant Naginskiy managed the remedial works for reactor 4.

Since 1994, Naginskiy has been deputy General Director of Installation and Construction Directorate – 90. In 1995 he initiated the integration of a range of enterprises of Sosnoviy Bor in a single holding, at the same year became the Board Chairman of Holding CONCERN TITAN-2. In 1996, he was appointed  Vice President of Public Associations "Soyuz Chernobul — Sosnoviy Bor" and President of NNO "Federation of Judo in Sosnoviy Bor." In 1999 he began to develop a political career and took various positions in different committees of the Legislative Assembly of Leningrad Oblast. During the period 2003-2001 Naginskiy was a member of the Federation Council of the Federal Assembly of the Russian Federation. He was appointed in 2010 as a Deputy Minister of Defence of the Russian Federation. and then in April 2011  as the Head of Federal Special Construction Agency.

Awards
Order of Courage for the strong spirit and self-sacrificing during the activity in Chernobyl NPP accident consequences elimination.
Honored Builder of Russian Federation for the merits in construction and for the longstanding and dedicated work.

References

External links 
 Biography on atomic-energy.ru
 Biography on lobbying.ru 
 Profile at Forbes

Living people
1958 births
People from Orsk
Members of the Federation Council of Russia (after 2000)
United Russia politicians
Recipients of the Order of Courage
Deputy Defence Ministers of Russia